Faron's Flamingos were an English band. In spite of having a lack of success due to poor decision making, they remain an important part of the Merseybeat history. They also have the distinction of being the first major example of the Mersey Motown sound with their release of "Do You Love Me".

Background
Fronted by William “Faron” Ruffley, the group was considered one of the best live groups on the Merseybeat scene. The Faron name came about as a result of the lead singer's antics on stage.  Bob Wooler, the DJ from The Cavern nicknamed him Faron, 'the panda-footed prince of prance'. Their blistering version of "Do You Love Me", according to Record Collector magazine was the first major example of the Mersey Motown sound.

Career

The Hi-Hats and The Ravens
The group's history can be traced back to the Hi-Hats which came together at the Liverpool Mercury Cycling Club. The group then changed its name to Robin and The Ravens with the lead singer Robin dressed in a  yellow silk suit and the band in pink jackets.

The Flamingos
They made their first appearance at The Cavern in 1962 with the Beatles singing backup. Also that year and with a growing following, they were offered a chance to go to France and play at the US army bases. Band member Eric London did not want to give up his job, so he did not travel. He was replaced by Dave Cooper. Bands touring France had to bring a female singer with them and they took a lady called Pam Connolly on tour with them. In spite of doing well, there were some issues with Billy Jones leaving the band. When the group returned to the UK, the line up was Nicky Crouch on lead guitar, Paddy Chambers on rhythm guitar, Faron Ruffley on bass and vocals and Trevor Morais on drums.

In May 1963, the group accepted an invitation to record some material for the album This Is Merseybeat. Also in 1963, their version of "Do You Love Me" was released on the Oriole label. Their lack of success with this song may have had something to do with publishing company Leeds Music pushing the other side of the single which was "See If She Cares". Writer Bill Harry and his wife Virginia were there at the Oriole Studio when the group recorded the song. It differed from the version that was recorded by the Contours. He said that John Schroeder asked them to go out to the street to ask some young folk to come in and dance to the recording. Some crates of beer were also brought in. People in the studio control room were surprised and everyone thought it had had chart hit written all over it and Schroeder said that it had the potential to top the chart.

In 1965, Faron reformed the band and performed in France until the late 1960s. He also had a version of the group running in the 1970s. Later versions of his Flamingos have included Brian Jones, Arty Davis, Phil Melia, Ken Shalliker, Billy Burton, Arthur Hayes, Nicky Crouch, Bernie Rogers and others.

Members
 Ronald "Ronnie" Plimmer - Tenor Saxophone
 Paddy Chambers - Guitar        Paddy Klaus and Gibson, Big 3, Sinbad
 Dave "Mushy" Cooper - Bass     undertakers
 Pam Connolly -     vocals
 Nicky Crouch -  Guitar, vocals      Mojos, Undertakers
 Billy Jones -  Guitar 
 Eric London -  Bass                    Group One, Mojos
 Trevor Morais - Drums            Peddlers,  Rory Storm Hurricanes, Quantum Jump
 Bill "Faron" Ruffley -  Vocals/bass  Big 3, Gerry and the Pacemakers, TTs       
 Peter Campbell- Bass guitar   Fontanas
 Vic Grace   -   lead guitar/ vocals    secrets  Hi Cats
 David Harris -  drums    Replaced by C Padaccici
 Pete Jones   -  lead guitar   ex Renegades  red Fire , alias Smith and Jones
 Arty Davies -    drums  Pressure Points, Lee Curtis All Stars tempos, Korner Kafe, Knight Crew, Kingsize Taylor band, Chris Curtis
 Keith Karlson -   Bass guitar    Mojos
 Johnny Jay Rathbone-    drums   Mastermind's Almost Blues,  Karl Terry cruisers
 John Mitch - drums Stopouts ,Ice Cream Robots
 Arthur Rigby -   Bass guitar
 Chris Evans -       lead guitar    Undertakers. Earl Preston TTs
 Max Peckham  -    drums
 Brian Jones  -  Tenor sax   Undertakers, Gary Glitter band, Ykickamoocow
 Mogsy Cook  -      Backing vocals
 Peter Cook jnr -    Bass guitar
 Peter Cook     -   lead guitar     Earl Royce and the Olympics ,Kansas City 5
 Derek Smallridge  -   drums       Four dees 
 Owen Roberts   -      Bass guitar   Jeannie and the Big Guys
 Dennis Collins -      lead guitar 
 Steve Robinson  -     Tenor sax
 Phil Melia   -         lead guitar   Mojo Filter, Pete Best band
 Ross Sullivan  -        keyboards   Dad is Peter O’Sullivan, horse racing commentator
 Steve Roberts   -        lead guitar  Cliff Roberts rockers
 Dennis Swale - Bass guitar - The Dimensions, Eddie Cave & The Fyx, Karl Terry & The Cruisers.
 Colin Drummond  -       keyboards
 Ronnie Plummer -       Tenor saxophone
 Bernie Rogers   -       drums    Denny Seyton and the Sabres 
 Arnie Neale   -        Rhythm guitar   Tempos  Hy-Tones
 Dave(Mac)McDowell-     Lead guitar 
 Mike Rudd     -      bass guitar    Avengers, Johnny Kidd and the Pirates, Karl terry Cruisers
 Billy Burton    -    Tenor sax       Pete Best Combo
 Arthur Hayes   -     bass guitar 
 Nic Johnston     -   harmonica
 George Fletcher  -   Lead guitar
 Bill Good      -    bass guitar      Buzz band  Undertakers
 Richie Ballard  -   bass guitar      Wheels on Fire   Cliff Roberts Rockers
 Tommy Hughes   -     keyboards      Kansas City 5, Swinging Blue Genes The Mojos
 Will Lloyd     -     harmonica
 Rachel Frost    -    vocals
 Ritchie Perkins  -    lead guitar     The tempos
 Frank Hopley    -      keyboards       The Mastersounds
 Denis Malkin    -      Rhythm guitar
 David Blackstone -     Lead  guitar     The Tabs, Gerry Deville City king,s  Big 3
 Alan Hanson      -     Lead  guitar     The Brumbeats, Shane Fenton Fentones
 Gary McInnes     -      keyboards/ gtr   new Applejacks
 David Morgan      -    Lead  guitar      Orig Fourmost , Dominoes
 Bobby Cortes      -    Lead  guitar      pro Wrestler (Bobby Bold Eagle) New York session man
 Phil Berube        -   keyboards/bass guitar  Beach Boys, Monkees, Joe Cocker
 Albie Donnelly    -    Tenor sax            Clayton Squares, Fix, Supercharge
 Al Peters        -     Harmonica             Almost Blues
 Barry{Basher}Robinson - rhythm/bass guitar/drums- Billy Heartbeats, Excerts,Gerry Deville City kings, The Kop, Georgies Germs 
 Mick Moon     -         keyboards
 Phil Hopkins   -        Tenor sax         Dominoes
 Mike Jones  -           lead guitar/vocals

Discography (selective)

Documentary and film

References

External links
 AllMusic: Faron's Flamingos
 Imdb: Faron's Flamingos
  Rickresource: Faron's Flamingos, Now That I Can Dance" by Peter R. McCormack
 Big Sixties Music Blog: Faron's Flamingos
 Nostalgia Central: Faron's Flamingos
 Discogs: Faron's Flamingos
 Sixties Ciy: Faron's Flamingos

English pop music groups
Beat groups
Musical groups established in 1962
Musical groups disestablished in 1963
Oriole Records (UK) artists
1962 establishments in England